Georgios Kalamidas (17 December 1944 – 2 September 2022) was a Greek judge. He served as president of the Supreme Civil and Criminal Court of Greece from 2009 to 2011.

Kalamidas died on 2 September 2022 at the age of 77.

References

1944 births
2022 deaths
20th-century Greek judges
Presidents of the Supreme Civil and Criminal Court of Greece
National and Kapodistrian University of Athens alumni
People from Agrinio
21st-century Greek judges